Klavdiya Sergeyevna Boyarskikh (11 November 1939 – 12 December 2009) was a Soviet cross-country skier who competed in the 1960s.

In 1964, Boyarskikh won her first Soviet titles, in the 5 km and relay, and was selected for the Olympic Games. There she ran the fastest leg of the 3 × 5 km relay, and became the first female cross-country skier to win all Olympic events. In 1966, she won two more national titles, in the 5 and 10 km, as well as two world titles. Next year she had her last two national victories, in the 5 km and relay. She also won three times at the Holmenkollen ski festival with two wins in 10 km (1965, 1966) and one win in the 5 km (1967). Boyarskikh retired in 1968 and until her death worked as a skiing coach with Lokomotiv Sverdlovsk. Since 1970, the annual Klavdiya Boyarskikh Cup in cross-country skiing is held in Sverdlovsk (now Yekaterinburg).

Cross-country skiing results
All results are sourced from the International Ski Federation (FIS).

Olympic Games
 3 medals – (3 gold)

World Championships
 3 medals – (2 gold, 1 silver)

References

 – click Vinnere for downloadable pdf file

External links

1939 births
2009 deaths
People from Verkhnyaya Pyshma
Cross-country skiers at the 1964 Winter Olympics
Holmenkollen Ski Festival winners
Olympic cross-country skiers of the Soviet Union
Olympic gold medalists for the Soviet Union
Russian female cross-country skiers
Soviet female cross-country skiers
Olympic medalists in cross-country skiing
FIS Nordic World Ski Championships medalists in cross-country skiing
Medalists at the 1964 Winter Olympics
Sportspeople from Sverdlovsk Oblast